Sarah Rose Cholmondeley, Marchioness of Cholmondeley (née Hanbury; born 15 March 1984), commonly known as Rose Hanbury, is a British peeress, former model and former political staffer. She is married to David Cholmondeley, 7th Marquess of Cholmondeley.

Early life 
Lady Cholmondeley is the daughter of Timothy Hanbury, a website designer, and Emma Hanbury (née Longman), a fashion designer. Her younger sister Marina is the third wife of Edward Lambton, 7th Earl of Durham. The landed gentry Hanbury family lived at Holfield Grange, Coggeshall, Essex.

Her maternal grandmother is Lady Elizabeth Lambart, daughter of Field Marshal Rudolph Lambart, 10th Earl of Cavan; Lady Elizabeth was one of the bridesmaids at the 1947 wedding of Princess Elizabeth and Lieutenant Philip Mountbatten; her paternal grandmother, Sara, was the daughter of racing driver Sir Tim Birkin, 3rd Bt.

Career 
Prior to her marriage, Lady Cholmondeley worked as a fashion model, represented by Storm Models, and as a researcher for conservative politician Michael Gove.

Personal life 
On 24 June 2009, Hanbury married David Cholmondeley, 7th Marquess of Cholmondeley, at Chelsea Town Hall, their engagement having been announced two days prior.

They have three children:
 Alexander Hugh George Cholmondeley, Earl of Rocksavage (born 12 October 2009) 
 Lord Oliver Timothy George Cholmondeley (born 12 October 2009)
 Lady Iris Marina Aline Cholmondeley (born March 2016)

The family resides at Houghton Hall, Norfolk. A friendship between the Marquess and Marchioness and the Prince and Princess of Wales has been reported; the Marchioness is a patron of the charity East Anglia's Children's Hospices (EACH), along with the Princess.

References 

Living people
1984 births
Rose
British models
Cholmondeley, Rose Cholmondeley, Marchioness of